Belmont House is a boutique hotel, located on the Avenida Rivera in Carrasco, Montevideo, Uruguay. It is set amidst gardens, has 24 rooms and suites and is served by the Restaurant Allegro. Belmont House retains the feel of an aristocratic home in Montevideo,  with its lavish furnishings, and rooms with rich and colorful linens, two and four posters beds, marble bathrooms and jacuzzis.

References

External links
Official website
Tours at Montevideo, starting in Belmont House

Hotel buildings completed in 1995
Hotels in Montevideo
Hotels established in 1995
1995 establishments in Uruguay
Carrasco, Montevideo